RCF S.p.A. (formerly Radio Cine Forniture - R.C.F. S.r.l.) is a widely recognized Italian manufacturer of high performance audio products including power amplifiers, loudspeakers, digital mixers and digital signal processors (DSP).

History 
RCF is an Italian audio products manufacturer founded in 1949 in Reggio Emilia. The first products sold were microphones and electroacoustic transducers (loudspeakers). In the late ’60s, concert sound was going electric, and many loudspeaker pioneers were searching for high-powered devices to use in their designs. RCF was one of the first European OEM suppliers for international brands, thanks to the experience built on high power transducers. After a few years, thanks to the in-depth know-how in loudspeaker technology, RCF began to develop and produce sound reinforcement systems under the same brand.

The introduction of the ART Series, in 1996, has established RCF among the few global manufacturers of active loudspeakers. The TT+ High Definition - Touring and Theater series equipped with DSP, introduced in 2004, and the RDNet Networked Management technology, gained RCF full recognition in the professional audio market. Since 2017, all DSP active speakers incorporate FiRPHASE technology, which allows achieving a 0° linear phase playback. RCF is the first audio manufacturer to have a complete catalogue of 0° phase-compatible sound systems including line arrays.
 In recent years, they have received some publicity due to their audio equipment being used at Elbenwald Music Festival 2019.

Professional Audio Systems 
 ART 3/4/7/9 - Portable Speakers
 Nx Series - Professional Speakers with Wood Cabinet
 D-Line & HDL - Professional Portable Speakers
 EVOX - Column Array Portable Speakers
 Max Series - Hi Performance Speakers for Entertainment
 Sub Series
 Analog Mixer series
 Digital Mixer series
 TT+ High Definition Touring & Theatre (big-sized high-definition systems)
 Studio Monitoring AYRA PRO / MYTHO / Iconica headphones

System Integration 
 Installed Audio
 Commercial Audio
 Business Music Series
 Forum Congress
 EN54 Systems
 VSA - Vertically Steerable Array
 COMPACT Series - Premium Install Speakers

Transducers 
 Precision Transducers

See also

 List of companies of Italy

References

External links 
 
 RCF Group Official Website
 http://www.corriere.it/digital-edition/CORRIEREFC_NAZIONALE_WEB/2017/05/04/39/palladio-compra-il-30-degli-amplificatori-rcf_U43310905692780qt.shtml

Audio amplifiers
Manufacturers of professional audio equipment
Electronics companies established in 1949
Audio equipment manufacturers of Italy
Headphones manufacturers
Italian companies established in 1949
Italian brands
Companies based in the Province of Reggio Emilia